Santa Maria alla Scala was a church built in the gothic style in Milan in 1381 and named in honour of Beatrice Regina della Scala, the wife of Bernabò Visconti who commissioned the building. The church was demolished in 1776 to make way for a new theatre which became known as Teatro alla Scala.

Notes

Churches completed in 1381
Former churches in Italy
Maria
1776 disestablishments
Gothic architecture in Milan
14th-century Roman Catholic church buildings in Italy
Demolished buildings and structures in Italy
Buildings and structures demolished in 1776